The Vivo NEX Dual Display is an Android smartphone which was launched on 11 December 2018. Given the tendency in the late 2010s toward bezelless displays, instead of trimming the display with a notch or hole for housing a front camera and face recognition sensor, it opts to use two screens (on both sides of the phone). Selfies and videocalls are made with the main camera and the rear display as viewfinder.

Reviews 
It has been described as a "wow" flagship device and "an unusual concept executed well".

References

Android (operating system) devices
Mobile phones introduced in 2018
Dual screen phone
Mobile phones with multiple rear cameras

Vivo smartphones
Mobile phones with 4K video recording
Discontinued flagship smartphones